Nanking is the older transliteration of Nanjing, a city in China.

Nanking may also refer to:

 Nanking (1938 film), a Japanese documentary film
 Nanking (2007 film), a 2007 film about the 1937 Nanking Massacre
 Nanking puppet (Reorganized National Government of the Republic of China)
 Nanking Massacre
 Nanking Cherry, a deciduous shrub
 2078 Nanking, an asteroid

See also 
 Nanjing (disambiguation)
 Nanjing Incident (disambiguation), including "Nanking Incident"
 Battles of Nanking, various battles